Persian weave is a method of weave used in jewelry and other art forms, using jump rings.  

The Persian family of weaves is a chainmail weave based on a stacked ring orientation. In the construction of Persian weaves the rings become stacked and form pairs. Most Persian weaves have both left and right-handed versions.

Sorts
Half Persian 3 in 1
Half Persian 4 in 1
Full Persian 6 in 1
Double Persian 10 in 1

External links
Half Persian weaves
Half-Persian 3-in-1 weave

Jewellery making
Weaves